Khin Zaw is a Burmese surgeon and professor. He serves as a director general of Food and Drug Administration (Myanmar). He previously served as Rector of the University of Medicine, Magway from March 2017 to July 2018 and as a pro-rector of University of Medicine 2, Yangon.

Early life and education
Khin Zaw was born in Yangon, Myanmar. He graduated from University of Medicine 2, Yangon and received M.B.,B.S degree.

References

Burmese surgeons
Living people
People from Yangon
Year of birth missing (living people)
University of Medicine 2, Yangon alumni